The American Risk and Insurance Association (ARIA) is a professional organization whose focus is the study and promotion of knowledge of risk management and insurance.  It was formed in 1932 and publishes two journals: Journal of Risk and Insurance and Risk Management and Insurance Review. The association hosts an annual meeting.

See also
Association of Insurance and Risk Managers in Industry and Commerce
Institute of Risk Management
Professional Risk Managers' International Association
Risk and Insurance Management Society
Global Association of Risk Professionals

References

External links
Official website 
Journal of Risk and Insurance
Risk Management and Insurance Review

Insurance in the United States